LeBron B. Shields (born July 23, 1937) is an American former professional football player who was a defensive end with the Baltimore Colts and Minnesota Vikings in the National Football League (NFL). He played college football for the Tennessee Volunteers.

References

1937 births
Living people
American football defensive ends
Tennessee Volunteers football players
Baltimore Colts players
Minnesota Vikings players
Players of American football from Georgia (U.S. state)
People from Walker County, Georgia